Palometsa is a village in Estonia, in Võru Parish, which belongs to Võru County.

References

 

Villages in Võru County
Võru Parish
Kreis Werro